Kineto Wireless is based in Milpitas, California and provides telco-OTT solutions to the mobile industry. Kineto's solutions enhance and extend communications services out over IP-based networks, such as the Internet.

Kineto is a privately held, venture-backed company whose investors, including Venrock Associates, Sutter Hill Ventures, Oak Investment Partners and SeaPointVentures.

Customers and partners include Acme Packet, HTC Corporation, Huawei, LG Electronics, Motorola, NewPace, Orange (telecommunications), Rogers Wireless, Research in Motion, Samsung Group, SFR, T-Mobile USA and ZTE.

The company innovated Unlicensed Mobile Access (UMA), also known as Generic Access Network (GAN).

References

External links 
 Official company website

Companies based in Milpitas, California
Software companies based in California
Defunct software companies of the United States